Tillandsia lutheri is a species of flowering plant in the family Bromeliaceae, endemic to Ecuador. It was first described in 2000 as Vriesea lutheri. Its natural habitat is subtropical or tropical moist montane forests.

References

lutheri
Flora of Ecuador
Plants described in 2000